Sergiyevy-Gorki is a rural locality (a selo) in Paustovskoye Rural Settlement, Vyaznikovsky District, Vladimir Oblast, Russia. The population was 462 as of 2010. There are 7 streets.

Geography 
Sergiyevy-Gorki is located on the Indrus River, 36 km south of Vyazniki (the district's administrative centre) by road. Prigorevo is the nearest rural locality.

References 

Rural localities in Vyaznikovsky District